Waterford is a city in County Waterford, Ireland.

Waterford may also refer to:

Places

Australia
Waterford, Western Australia
Waterford, Queensland, a suburb
Electoral district of Waterford, the electoral district for that suburb

Canada
Waterford Parish, New Brunswick
Waterford, Nova Scotia
Waterford, Ontario
New Waterford, Nova Scotia

England
 Waterford, Hertfordshire
 The yacht basin and mudflats of the former docks area in Lymington, Hampshire

Jamaica
A neighbourhood in the city of Portmore

United States
Waterford Township
Waterford, California
Waterford Village, California
Waterford, Connecticut, a town
Waterford (CDP), Connecticut, a census-designated place
Waterford, Indiana
Waterford, Maine
Waterford (town), New York
Waterford (village), New York, within the town
Waterford, Knox County, Ohio
Waterford, Washington County, Ohio
Waterford, Pennsylvania
Waterford, Rhode Island
Waterford, Vermont
Waterford, Virginia
Waterford (town), Wisconsin
Waterford, Wisconsin, village mostly within the town

Zimbabwe
Waterford, an outlying suburb of Bulawayo

Electoral divisions
Waterford (Dáil constituency), current electoral division for County Waterford, Ireland
Electoral district of Waterford current electoral division in Queensland, Australia
Waterford City (UK Parliament constituency), electoral division for Waterford, Ireland until 1922
County Waterford (UK Parliament constituency), electoral division for County Waterford, Ireland until 1922
Waterford City (Parliament of Ireland constituency), electoral division for Waterford, Ireland until 1800
Waterford County (Parliament of Ireland constituency), electoral division for County Waterford, Ireland until 1800

Schools and colleges
Waterford Institute of Technology, a third level college in Ireland
Waterford College of Further Education, a vocational college in Ireland
The Waterford School, a private K-12 liberal arts school in Sandy, Utah
Waterford Kamhlaba, a United World College is located in Mbabane, Eswatini
Waterford High School.

People
Crown Prince Waterford, American blues and jazz singer
Jack Waterford, Australian journalist
Janet Bragg (Janet Harmon Waterford Bragg), American aviator

Other
Waterford Crystal, a brand of crystal glassware
Waterford GAA, administrative body for Gaelic Games in Co. Waterford, Ireland
Waterford F.C., Football club based in Waterford, Ireland
Waterford Airport in the southeast of Ireland
Waterford railway station in Waterford, Ireland
Bishop of Waterford in Ireland
Marquess of Waterford, a title in the Peerage of Ireland
Roman Catholic Diocese of Waterford and Lismore in Ireland
Waterford West, Queensland, a suburb of Brisbane, Australia
Waterford Nuclear Generating Station, a nuclear power plant near New Orleans, Louisiana
Waterford Precision Cycles, American bicycle manufacturer